Mitchell "Mitch" Brown (born 17 December 1988) is a former professional Australian rules footballer who played for the West Coast Eagles in the Australian Football League (AFL). Originally from Ballarat, Victoria, he played under-18 football for the North Ballarat Rebels in the TAC Cup before being recruited by West Coast with the 16th pick overall in the 2006 National Draft. He made his debut for West Coast in round one of the 2007 season, and played a total of 94 games for the club, alternating between defence and the forward line. Brown's career has been interrupted by injuries, causing him to miss the entire 2008 season and 2015 season, as well as significant parts of the 2010 and 2011 seasons.

Career
Brown was born on 17 December 1988 in Ballarat, Victoria. He attended St Patrick's College in Ballarat, and played junior football for the Ballarat Football and Netball Club, and under-18s for the North Ballarat Rebels in the TAC Cup, as a key forward. Brown was selected by the West Coast Eagles with pick 16 in the 2006 National Draft.

Brown made his debut for the West Coast Eagles in Round 1 of the 2007 season against the Sydney Swans, in a rematch of the 2006 AFL Grand Final. He played five games in his debut season, playing in both in the forward and back lines. He missed the entire 2008 season because of a knee reconstruction, before rebounding to play 19 games in 2009, including winning a Rising Star Award nomination in Round 19 against the Western Bulldogs.

Brown played 13 games in the 2010 season, being dropped three times. He played in the forward line for much of the first half of the season, but was in and out of form. He found a role as the Eagles' centre half-back towards the end of the season, becoming one of their better players in defence, before his season was ended by a groin injury.

At the conclusion of the 2016 season, Brown announced he had signed with St Kevin's Old Boys Football Club in the VAFA after he was delisted by West Coast after failing to facilitate a trade to a Victorian club during the trade period.

Personal life
His wife, Shae Brown (née Bolton), is a professional netball player.

Statistics

|- style="background:#eaeaea;"
! scope="row" style="text-align:center" | 2007
|  || 1 || 5 || 2 || 3 || 33 || 17 || 50 || 25 || 4 || 0.4 || 0.6 || 6.6 || 3.4 || 10.0 || 5.0 || 0.8
|-
! scope="row" style="text-align:center" | 2008
|  || 1 || 0 || 0 || 0 || 0 || 0 || 0 || 0 || 0 || 0.0 || 0.0 || 0.0 || 0.0 || 0.0 || 0.0 || 0.0
|- style="background:#eaeaea;"
! scope="row" style="text-align:center" | 2009
|  || 1 || 19 || 4 || 1 || 104 || 176 || 280 || 86 || 32 || 0.2 || 0.1 || 5.5 || 9.2 || 14.7 || 4.5 || 1.7
|-
! scope="row" style="text-align:center" | 2010
|  || 1 || 13 || 4 || 5 || 77 || 101 || 178 || 43 || 24 || 0.3 || 0.4 || 5.9 || 7.8 || 13.7 || 3.3 || 1.8
|- style="background:#eaeaea;"
! scope="row" style="text-align:center" | 2011
|  || 1 || 6 || 0 || 0 || 39 || 23 || 62 || 14 || 10 || 0.0 || 0.0 || 6.5 || 3.8 || 10.3 || 2.3 || 1.7
|-
! scope="row" style="text-align:center" | 2012
|  || 1 || 8 || 0 || 0 || 26 || 43 || 69 || 22 || 8 || 0.0 || 0.0 || 3.2 || 5.4 || 8.6 || 2.8 || 1.0
|- style="background:#eaeaea;"
! scope="row" style="text-align:center" | 2013
|  || 1 || 19 || 0 || 2 || 83 || 105 || 188 || 55 || 44 || 0.0 || 0.1 || 4.4 || 5.5 || 9.9 || 2.9 || 2.3
|- style="background:#eaeaea;"
! scope="row" style="text-align:center" | 2014
|  || 1 || 19 || 3 || 1 || 87 || 95 || 182 || 50 || 41 || 0.2 || 0.1 || 4.6 || 5.0 || 9.6 || 2.6 || 2.2
|-
! scope="row" style="text-align:center" | 2015
|  || 1 || 1 || 0 || 0 || 0 || 2 || 2 || 0 || 0 || 0.0 || 0.0 || 0.0 || 2.0 || 2.0 || 0.0 || 0.0
|- style="background:#eaeaea;"
! scope="row" style="text-align:center" | 2016
|  || 1 || 4 || 1 || 1 || 13 || 20 || 33 || 6 || 14 || 0.3 || 0.3 || 3.3 || 5.0 || 8.3 || 1.5 || 3.5
|- class="sortbottom"
! colspan=3| Career
! 94
! 14
! 13
! 462
! 582
! 1044
! 301
! 177
! 0.2
! 0.1
! 4.9
! 6.2
! 11.1
! 3.2
! 1.9
|}

References

External links

1988 births
East Fremantle Football Club players
Living people
Greater Western Victoria Rebels players
Australian rules footballers from Ballarat
Australian twins
Twin sportspeople
West Coast Eagles players
People educated at St Patrick's College, Ballarat
East Perth Football Club players